Delicate may refer to:

Music
 Delicate (album), by Martha & The Muffins (2010)
 "Delicate" (Taylor Swift song), song by Taylor Swift from Reputation (2017)
 "Delicate" (Terence Trent D'Arby song), by Terence Trent D'Arby featuring Des'ree from Symphony or Damn (1993)
 "Delicate", song by D. Rice from  O (2002)
 "Delicate", song by Operator from   Soulcrusher (2007)

Other uses
 Delicates, garments that include delicate fabrics
 Delicacies
 Mythimna vitellina (the delicate), a moth of the family Noctuidae